Greatest Hits is a compilation album by the band Blood, Sweat & Tears, initially released in February 1972.

Although Blood, Sweat & Tears continued to record and tour for several more years, the band's lineup changed dramatically after Blood, Sweat & Tears 4. This compilation album includes all of the group's best-known material up to that time. This was the group's last album to earn a Gold Record award.

Columbia initially chose to incorporate the edited single versions of many of the songs, a decision which was poorly received by some fans. Some later Compact Disc releases replaced the single versions with the full length album versions.

In 1999 the album was remastered and re-released on CD with two bonus tracks - "So Long Dixie" and "More And More". In 2016, Audio Fidelity released a Super Audio CD version with the single versions as in the original release. This was a numbered limited edition mastered by Steve Hoffman and Stephen Marsh.

Reception

Writing for Allmusic, critic William Ruhlman wrote the album "captures the band's peak in 11 selections—seven singles chart entries, plus two album tracks from the celebrated debut album when Al Kooper helmed the group, and two more from the Grammy-winning multi-platinum second album... For the millions who learned to love BS&T in 1969 when they were all over AM radio, this is the ideal selection of their most accessible material." Music critic Robert Christgau's commented "their pop success does them more good in Vegas than on the radio, and only four of these eleven cuts made top twenty."

Track listing
The original LP & CD releases include the following eleven tracks in the order listed.

Personnel
David Clayton-Thomas - lead vocals except as noted, guitar on "Go Down Gamblin'"
Steve Katz - electric guitar, acoustic guitar, harmonica, mandolin, vocals, lead vocals on "Sometimes In Winter"
Jim Fielder - bass guitar
Al Kooper - Piano, Organ, lead vocals on "I Can't Quit Her" and " I Love You More Than You'll Ever Know"
Dick Halligan - organ, piano, electric piano, harpsichord, celeste, trombone, flute, alto flute, baritone horn, vocals
Fred Lipsius - piano, organ, alto saxophone, clarinet, vocals
Lew Soloff - trumpet, flugelhorn, piccolo trumpet
Jerry Weiss - trumpet, flugelhorn, vocals
Chuck Winfield - trumpet, flugelhorn
Randy Brecker - trumpet, flugelhorn
Dave Bargeron - trombone, tuba, bass trombone, baritone horn, acoustic bass
Jerry Hyman - trombone, bass trombone, recorder
Bobby Colomby - drums, percussion, vocals

Charts
Album - Billboard (United States)

References

Blood, Sweat & Tears albums
1972 greatest hits albums
Albums produced by James William Guercio
Albums produced by John Simon (record producer)
Albums produced by Roy Halee
Albums produced by Bobby Colomby
Columbia Records compilation albums